Pavone may refer to:

Places in Italy
Pavone del Mella, in the province of Brescia
Pavone Canavese, in the province of Turin

People
Chris Pavone (born 1968), American bestselling novelist
Claudio Pavone (1920–2016), Italian historian
 Dallas Von Pavone (1940-2012), American fine artist, musician, and actor
Francesco Saverio Pavone (1944–2020), Italian magistrate
Frank Pavone (born 1959), laicized American Roman Catholic priest
Kris Pavone, American professional wrestler
Kyle Pavone (1990-2018), American singer
Mariano Pavone (born 1982), Argentine footballer playing for River Plate
Mario Pavone (1940-2021), American jazz musician
Michael Pavone, American film writer and director
 (born 1948), Italian botanist
Rita Pavone (born 1945), Italian pop singer and film actress

Characters 
Signor Pavone Lanzetti, a character in the 1974 Italian film Swept Away